Grove Lake is a lake in Clay and Otter Tail counties, in the U.S. state of Minnesota.

Grove Lake was named for the grove on the lake island within the lake.

See also
List of lakes in Minnesota

References

Lakes of Otter Tail County, Minnesota
Lakes of Clay County, Minnesota
Lakes of Minnesota